Retroflex affricate can refer to:

Voiced retroflex affricate
Voiceless retroflex affricate